The Njurunda Church is a church building in Njurundabommen, Sweden. Belonging to the Njurunda Parish of the Church of Sweden, it was opened on 13 April 1865 by bishop Anders Fredrik Beckman .

References

External links

19th-century Church of Sweden church buildings
Churches in Västernorrland County
Churches completed in 1865
Churches in the Diocese of Härnösand
1865 establishments in Sweden